Herpetogramma rudis is a moth in the family Crambidae. It was described by Warren in 1892. It is found in China, Japan, Tibet, Korea and India.

The wingspan is 25–28 mm.

References

Moths described in 1892
Herpetogramma
Moths of Asia
Moths of Japan